Lionel Tollemache may refer to:
Lionel Tollemache, 3rd Earl of Dysart (1649–1727)
Lionel Tollemache, 4th Earl of Dysart (1708–1770)
Lionel Tollemache, 5th Earl of Dysart (1734–1799)
Lionel Tollemache, 8th Earl of Dysart (1794–1878)
Sir Lionel Tollemache, 1st Baronet (1562–1612)
Sir Lionel Tollemache, 2nd Baronet (1591–1640)
Sir Lionel Tollemache, 3rd Baronet (1624–1669)

See also
 Sir Lyonel Tollemache, 4th Baronet (1854–1952)